Ieung (sign: ㅇ; Korean: 이응) is a consonant letter of the Korean alphabet, Hangul. The Unicode for ㅇ is U+3147. It is silent when used at the beginning of a syllable (it is a consonant placeholder in vowel letters). However, ㅇ might take on the glottal stop ʔ sound on some occasions. And it takes on the [ŋ] sound when it is the ending consonant in a syllable.

Stroke order

References 

Hangul jamo